Noah Strausser Speer Wyle (born June 4, 1971) is an American actor. He is best known for his role as John Carter in the television series ER (1994–2009), which earned him nominations for three Golden Globe Awards and five Primetime Emmy Awards. He is also known for his roles as Flynn Carsen in The Librarian franchise including three TV movies The Librarian: Quest for the Spear (2004), The Librarian: Return to King Solomon's Mine (2006), and The Librarian: Curse of the Judas Chalice (2008) then returning for the television series (2013–2018) and Tom Mason in the television series Falling Skies (2011–2015). He has appeared in films such as A Few Good Men (1992), Pirates of Silicon Valley (1999), Donnie Darko (2001), and W. (2008).

Wyle was nominated for a Critics' Choice Television Award for his role as Daniel Calder in the television miniseries The Red Line (2019).

Early life
Wyle, the middle of three children, was born in Hollywood, California, the son of Marjorie (née Speer), a registered orthopedic head nurse, and Stephen Wyle, an electrical engineer and entrepreneur. His father was Jewish (of Russian-Jewish descent), whereas his mother was Episcopalian, and he was raised "fairly nondenominationally", around both faiths. Wyle's parents divorced in the late 1970s, and his mother later married James C. Katz, a film restorationist with three children of his own from a previous marriage. Wyle's paternal grandparents, Edith and Frank Wyle, founded the Los Angeles Craft and Folk Art Museum, and his grandfather also founded Wyle Laboratories. Edith R. Wyle was an expressionist painter who also created The Egg and The Eye, a café and shop in the Miracle Mile district of Los Angeles.

Wyle was educated at The Thacher School in Ojai, California, and graduated with the class of 1989. Wyle participated in a Theatre Arts program at Northwestern University after his junior year of high school and appeared in high school plays, even winning an award for a play he wrote. After graduation, he studied with acting teacher Larry Moss while living in a small apartment on Hollywood Boulevard.

Career

ER
Wyle's big break came when he was given the pilot script for ER and was cast as medical student John Carter. He was the youngest member when he joined the cast. Wyle was the only major cast member of ER to have been with the show since its inception (1994) when he left after its eleventh season (2005). His performances on the show earned him Emmy Award nominations in each of its first five seasons. As part of an ensemble he was nominated several times for the Screen Actors Guild Award, he was recognized with three Golden Globe nominations as Best Supporting Actor in a Series, Miniseries or Motion Picture Made for Television and won the 2001 TV Guide Award for Supporting Actor in a Drama Series. Wyle left the series at the end of season 11, although he returned in guest appearances for a four-episode arc during season 12. He stated that he left because he wanted to spend more time with his family and friends and to make room for the upcoming generation. However, in 2009, Wyle returned to ER during its fifteenth and final season for five episodes, including the series finale.
According to the Guinness World Records 2005 Special 50th Anniversary Edition, Wyle became the holder of a "Highest paid TV drama actor per episode" record during the 2003–2004 tenth season, earning approximately $400,000 per episode. While on ER, Wyle's estimated salary was $9 million a year. Wyle has also appeared in the most episodes of ER, 254, four more than Laura Innes.

Film

Wyle was first seen in the Paul Bartel 1985 film Lust in the Dust (a western exploitation/parody which starred Tab Hunter, Lainie Kazan, and Divine) as an extra in the local gang running the small town of Chili Verde.

His later roles were a mini-series and featuring in the movie Crooked Hearts (1991) in 1990. In 1993 he appeared in another feature film, There Goes My Baby. After appearing in several local plays in Los Angeles, he was cast in the box-office hit A Few Good Men, in which he played a Marine jeep driver who testified in court. He also appeared in the feature Swing Kids as Emil Lutz, a leader in the Hitler Youth, and in the independent movie The Myth of Fingerprints with Roy Scheider, Blythe Danner, and Julianne Moore. Additionally, he starred as Lancelot opposite Sheryl Lee in the Television movie Guinevere. Wyle starred in the original film The Librarian: Quest for the Spear with Sonya Walger, in its sequel The Librarian: Return to King Solomon's Mines opposite Gabrielle Anwar, and in the third part of the series The Librarian: Curse of the Judas Chalice alongside Stana Katic.

His latest work dealing with The Librarian is a series called The Librarians. It focuses on three additional new librarians who are brought into the library at a time of cataclysmic events. In the beginning of the series, Noah Wyle was more of a co-star, versus his original role of the main character. In the following seasons, he had more and more appearances. Until, with the latest season, he 'supposedly' quit the job of The Librarian.

His other work has included a critically acclaimed turn as Steve Jobs in the Emmy-nominated Pirates of Silicon Valley (1999). Steve Jobs was so impressed with the performance that he invited Wyle to step on stage as him at the opening of his annual speech at the Apple convention. He has also appeared in several feature films, including White Oleander opposite Renée Zellweger, Enough opposite Jennifer Lopez, the independent feature Donnie Darko, as the President's interpreter in the 2000 live-television production of Fail Safe, and in the independent film The Californians.

Stage

Along with his film and television career, Wyle is also Artistic Producer of The Blank Theatre Company located in Hollywood, California. With the company, he has appeared on stage in the 1995 production of The 24th Day with Peter Berg, The Why (as part of the company's Young Playwrights Festival), and Lobster Alice, opposite Nicholas Brendon, where he played the surrealist painter Salvador Dalí.

For his work as one of the producers of 2005 Los Angeles Production of Michael John LaChiusa's The Wild Party, he won an NAACP Theatre Award.

Falling Skies
Wyle starred as the lead in TNT's sci-fi series Falling Skies. Wyle plays Tom Mason, a former Boston University history professor who becomes the second-in-command of the 2nd Massachusetts Militia Regiment, a group of civilians and fighters fleeing post-apocalyptic Boston while fighting aliens who have wiped out 90% of humanity. The character was also the father of three boys, one of whom was captured by the aliens. Wyle's performance earned him BuddyTV's #91 position on its list of "TV's Sexiest Men of 2011".

Post-Falling Skies
In 2018, Wyle announced that he will portray Daniel Calder in the eight-part limited series The Red Line. On April 22, 2020, Wyle confirmed that he will join the revival of the series, Leverage, reuniting with John Rogers, Dean Devlin and Christian Kane who worked with him on The Librarians. He will also be directing two of the 13 episodes.

Personal life
Noah met his first wife, make-up artist Tracy Warbin, on the set of The Myth of Fingerprints. They married in 2000 and have a son, Owen Strausser Speer Wyle (born November 9, 2002), and a daughter, Auden Wyle (born October 15, 2005). Wyle and Warbin separated in 2009 and divorced in 2010. 

Wyle married Sara Wells in June 2014 in California. The couple met in 2011 during a production at The Blank Theatre Company. Their daughter Frances Harper Wyle was born on June 22, 2015.

Wyle is a vegetarian and supports animal rights.

Political advocacy and philanthropy
Wyle opened the 1999 NY Macworld Expo keynote, initially posing as Apple Inc.'s Steve Jobs. It was a practical joke on the audience, engineered by Jobs and Wyle in light of the 1999 TNT film Pirates of Silicon Valley.

Wyle devotes much of his free time to the international non-profit organization Doctors of the World and to his work as a member of the Human Rights Watch Council. Wyle also serves as the voluntary artistic producer of the Blank Theatre Company in Hollywood, which stages an annual young playwrights festival and whose alumni include Ed Asner, Sarah Michelle Gellar, D. B. Sweeney, James Kerwin, Amber Benson, Megan Henning, Travis Schuldt, Warren Davis, Grant Show, and Nicholas Brendon. He also recently acquired Second Stage Theater (Los Angeles) in Hollywood, where the company has mounted numerous successful productions.

Wyle was the spokesperson for The Cover the Uninsured campaign in 2004, which had as Honorary Co-Chairs former Presidents Gerald Ford and Jimmy Carter. The Cover the Uninsured Week is annually held in the United States of America and focuses attention on the nearly 44 million Americans who go without health care coverage. The campaign includes several events among different communities, health and enrollment fairs, press conferences, and business seminars all over the U.S. Additionally, Wyle is a supporter of animal rights and a spokesman for the World Wildlife Fund, dedicated to protecting and conserving wildlife for future generations.

In 2009, Wyle became a spokesperson for the World Wide Fund for Nature (WWF), claiming that polar bears are "hanging on by a thread" and "may be extinct in our children's lifetime, due to the effects of climate change."

In 2012, Wyle supported the disability rights group ADAPT. On April 23, he was arrested during a protest on Capitol Hill to fight against Medicaid cuts for the elderly and people with disabilities.

Filmography

Film

Television

Awards and nominations

References

External links

 
Noah Wyle and Steve Jobs at 1999 Macworld NY (video clip)

1971 births
20th-century American male actors
21st-century American male actors
American male film actors
American male television actors
American people of Russian-Jewish descent
Living people
Northwestern University School of Communication alumni
People from Ojai, California
Male actors from Hollywood, Los Angeles
Jewish American male actors
The Thacher School alumni
21st-century American Jews